The 2021 ANA Inspiration was the 50th ANA Inspiration golf tournament, held April 1–4, 2021 at the Dinah Shore Tournament Course of Mission Hills Country Club in Rancho Mirage, California. It was its 39th year as a major championship on the LPGA Tour, and Golf Channel televised the event for the 11th consecutive year. The tournament was originally known as the Colgate-Dinah Shore Winner's Circle.

Patty Tavatanakit won her first LPGA Tour event by two strokes over Lydia Ko. Tavatanakit won the event wire-to-wire and became the first rookie to win the ANA Inspiration since Juli Inkster in 1984 and the fourth straight first-time major winner.

Field

Players who have qualified for the event are listed below. Players are listed under the first category in which they qualified; additional qualifying categories are shown in parentheses. 

1. Active LPGA Tour Hall of Fame members (must have participated in ten official LPGA Tour tournaments within the 12 months prior to the commitment deadline)

2. Winners of all previous ANA Inspirations

3. Winners of the U.S. Women's Open, Women's PGA Championship, and Ricoh Women's British Open in the previous five years

4. Winners of The Evian Championship in the previous five years

5. Winners of official LPGA Tour tournaments from the 2016 ANA Inspiration through the week immediately preceding the 2021 ANA Inspiration

6. All players who finished in the top-20 in the previous year's ANA Inspiration

7. All players who finished in the top-5 of the previous year's U.S. Women's Open, Women's PGA Championship, Ricoh Women's British Open and The Evian Championship

8. Top-80 on the previous year's season-ending LPGA Tour official money list

9. Top-30 on the Women's World Golf Rankings as of a March 8, 2021

10. Top-2 players from the previous year's season-ending Ladies European Tour Order of Merit, LPGA of Japan Tour money list and LPGA of Korea Tour money list

11. Top-20 players plus ties on the current year LPGA Tour official money list at the end of the last official tournament prior to the current ANA Inspiration, not otherwise qualified above, provided such players are within the top-80 positions on the current year LPGA Tour official money list at the beginning of the tournament competition

12. Previous year's Louise Suggs Rolex Rookie of the Year

13. Previous year's U.S. Women's Amateur champion, provided she is still an amateur at the beginning of tournament competition

14. Any LPGA Member who did not compete in the previous year's ANA Inspiration major due to injury, illness or maternity, who subsequently received a medical/maternity extension of membership from the LPGA in the previous calendar year, provided they were otherwise qualified to compete in the previous year's ANA Inspiration

15. Up to six sponsor invitations for top-ranked amateur players

Round summaries

First round
Thursday, April 1, 2021

Second round
Friday, April 2, 2021

Third round
Saturday, April 3, 2021

Final round
Sunday, April 4, 2021

Scorecard
Final round

Cumulative tournament scores, relative to par
{|class="wikitable" span = 50 style="font-size:85%;
|-
|style="background: Red;" width=10|
|Eagle
|style="background: Pink;" width=10|
|Birdie
|style="background: PaleGreen;" width=10|
|Bogey
|}

References

External links

Coverage on the LPGA Tour official site

Chevron Championship
Golf in California
ANA Inspiration
ANA Inspiration
ANA Inspiration
ANA Inspiration